Chintheche is a settlement in the Nkhata Bay District of the Northern Region of Malawi. The town is close to the main road between Nkhata Bay and Nkhotakota.

History
In the 1970s, the government of Hastings Banda planned to develop Chintheche, with a new harbour and a paper-processing plant. To accommodate the new development, residents of Chintheche were displaced further inland. The scheme would have created employment for thousands of people, but for the most part did not come to fruition; however, the displaced residents were not allowed to return to their lakeshore homes.

Arts and culture

Chintheche is where the Lake of Stars Music Festival was held from 2004–2007.

Attractions and amenities
Chintheche has bars, restaurants, guestlodges, campsites, a supermarket and a cash and carry wholesaler; the majority of the town's amenities are along the Chintheche Strip.

Parks and recreation

The settlement is also identified as a beach town, as it is located on the beaches of Lake Malawi, including Chintheche Beach. The beaches are similar to those found in the Caribbean, with white sand and tropical plants.

Infrastructure
Chintheche is on the paved M5 Salima – Mzuzu road. It is served by minibuses from Nkhata Bay, Nkhotakota and Mzuzu. Most roads in the Chintheche area are dirt tracks. There is one police station.

Sources

Davids Been Here, ''Malawi: Africa County Travel Guide 2014." Davids Been Here (2014).

Footnotes

Additional citations

External links

Populated places in Northern Region, Malawi
Lake Malawi